The Statue of Eric Morecambe in Morecambe, Lancashire, England is a commemorative bronze sculpture of Eric Morecambe (1926–1984) by Graham Ibbeson. It was unveiled by the Queen in July 1999. It depicts Morecambe in his "Bring Me Sunshine" pose and overlooks Morecambe Bay.

References

Buildings and structures in Morecambe
Bronze sculptures in England
Outdoor sculptures in England